The 2020 Mississippi Republican presidential primary took place on March 10, 2020, as one of five contests scheduled for that date in the Republican presidential primaries for the 2020 election.

Results

Incumbent President Donald Trump was challenged by two candidates: businessman and perennial candidate Rocky De La Fuente of California, and former governor Bill Weld of Massachusetts.

References

Mississippi Republican
Republican primary
Mississippi Republican primaries